The Honda Civic Tour was an annual concert tour, sponsored by American Honda Motor Company and produced by Marketing Factory.

2001

First half
Headliner: Blink-182
Supporting: No Motiv, Sum 41, The Ataris, and Bodyjar

Second half
Headliner: Everclear
Supporting: American Hi-Fi and The Mayfield Four

2002
Headliner: Incubus
Supporting: Hoobastank and Phantom Planet

2003
Headliner: New Found Glory and Good Charlotte
Supporting: Eve 6, Hot Rod Circuit, Less Than Jake, MxPx, Stretch Arm Strong, The Movielife, and The Disasters

2004
Headliner: Dashboard Confessional
Supporting: The Get Up Kids, Thrice, Val Emmich, The Format, Say Anything, Hot Water Music, Motion City Soundtrack and Head Automatica

2005

Headliner: Maroon 5
Supporting: Phantom Planet, The Donnas and The Thrills

2006
Headliner: The Black Eyed Peas (Given away from the music video of "Pump It")
Supporting: Flipsyde and The Pussycat Dolls

2007
Headliner: Fall Out Boy
Supporting: +44, The Academy Is..., Cobra Starship, Hey Monday and Paul Wall

2008
Headliner: Panic! at the Disco
Supporting: The Hush Sound, Motion City Soundtrack, Death Cab For Cutie, and Phantom Planet

2009
Originally planned for All-American Rejects and Jack's Mannequin to co-headline the tour, but it was cancelled possibly due to the No Doubt and Blink 182 concerts taking place around the same time.

2010
Headliner: Paramore
Supporting: Tegan and Sara (except on the show of July 28 at the Comcast Center and the show of July 30 in Norfolk Virginia, where Relient K performed), New Found Glory, Kadawatha

2011

Headliner: Blink-182 and My Chemical Romance
Supporting: Rancid, Manchester Orchestra, Against Me!, Matt and Kim, Alkaline Trio (Performed 8/7), Neon Trees (Performed 9/8)

2012

Headliner: Linkin Park & Incubus
Supporting: Mutemath

2013

Headliner: Maroon 5 & Kelly Clarkson
Supporting: Rozzi Crane, Tony Lucca, PJ Morton

2014

Headliner: Grouplove & Portugal. The Man, American Authors, 3BallMTY
Supporting: Typhoon, Tokyo Police Club, Echosmith

2015

Headliner: One Direction
Supporting: Icona Pop

2016

Headliner: Demi Lovato & Nick Jonas
Supporting: Mike Posner, Chord Overstreet

2017

Headliner: OneRepublic
Supporting: Fitz and the Tantrums, James Arthur

2018

Headliner: Charlie Puth
Supporting: Hailee Steinfeld

2020

Headliner: Niall Horan
Supporting: Lewis Capaldi, FLETCHER, and Sam Fischer

2022 

 Headliner: The Future X

References

External links

 Official website

Concert tours
Tour
Concert tour
Recurring events established in 2001